Dr Evelyn Smythe is a fictional character played by Maggie Stables in a series of audio plays produced by Big Finish Productions based on the long-running British science fiction television series Doctor Who. A professor of history from the 20th century with a fondness for chocolate, she is a companion of the Sixth Doctor and encounters the Seventh Doctor as well.

Character history
Evelyn first appeared in the play The Marian Conspiracy (2000), when the Sixth Doctor found her while searching for a temporal nexus point. Travelling with the Doctor back to 1554, she became involved with the turmoil surrounding the reign of Queen Mary, which soon gave way to that of her half-sister Elizabeth. At the end of that adventure, Evelyn insisted on accompanying the Doctor further, because as a historian, she saw the chance to travel in a time machine as irresistible.

Evelyn was fifty-five when she began her travels with the Doctor.  Being more mature than most of the Doctor's other companions, she was more than a match for the more abrasive Sixth Doctor, often questioning his decisions and counselling him. In turn, the Sixth Doctor recognized Evelyn's wisdom and ability and respected her advice.

Their relationship was not always smooth. Evelyn had a heart condition which she kept from the Doctor, fearing that he would return her home if he found out. She also blamed the Doctor for his inability to save a young woman named Cassie in Project: Lazarus (2003), something the Seventh Doctor said she never forgave him for, even when she parted ways with him.

While visiting the planet Világ and helping repel an alien invasion by an aggressive humanoid canid species known as the Killoran's, Evelyn met and fell in love with Governor Rossiter, who eventually became the political head of the union of three nations (Arrangements for War, 2004). When she and the Doctor returned a year later, Evelyn decided to stay and marry Rossiter. She subsequently became involved in the politics of Világ and underwent surgery for her heart. The surgery, however, did not correct her heart condition; without her knowledge, she was injected with blood extracted from Killoran prisoners. The infusion disguised Evelyn's heart condition but also caused her to suffer from headaches, increased aggressiveness, and irritability.

Two years later, the Sixth Doctor brought his new companion Mel to visit Evelyn on Világ. During their visit, Evelyn was kidnapped by a political enemy, and during the ordeal, she became seriously ill as a result of the Killoran blood in her system. With the Doctor's aid, Rossiter's daughter Sofia, a physician, corrected the effects of the Killoran blood. During her recovery, Evelyn was secretly paid a visit by the Seventh Doctor. He wanted to tell Evelyn that Cassie's son, Hex, was now travelling with him, and assured her that some good had come out of the tragedy (Thicker than Water, 2005).

Evelyn continued to appear alongside the Sixth Doctor in new audio releases, set before her departure.

The end of her life is chronicled in A Death in the Family. A decade after her husband Rossiter died, Evelyn took part in an archaeological dig of alien technology, which resulted in her being accidentally transported to a planet called Pelicham, billions of years in the past. A few years later, Hex was dropped off on Pelicham after the Seventh Doctor died fighting a pan-dimensional enemy called Nobody No-One. Evelyn took Hex in as her ward for several months and told him about his mother, Cassie. The Doctor's other companion, Ace, resurrected the Doctor, and he travelled to Pelicham on the day Evelyn died of a heart attack. With her consent, he trapped Nobody No-One in her mind, and they died together.

Other appearances
In Instruments of Darkness, a novel by Gary Russell published as part of the Past Doctor Adventures line, it was stated that the Doctor did eventually bring Evelyn back to Earth, albeit ten years before she left, forcing her to lie low so as not to interfere with the life of her younger self. At the end of Instruments, the Doctor (at this point travelling with Mel) agreed to take Evelyn back to her proper time, and to take the "scenic route", implying further adventures. The novel also featured the first meeting between Evelyn and Mel. How these events can be reconciled with those in Thicker than Water is not clear, and supports the proposition that the novels and audios take place in separate continuities.

Evelyn also appeared in the webcast Sixth Doctor story Real Time, which ended on a cliff-hanger where Evelyn was infected by a techno virus that would eventually turn her into the Cybermen's Cybercontroller and infect Earth in 1927. The story was produced for the BBC website by Big Finish, but due to BBC moving its webcast production in-house (and the subsequent death of Maggie Stables), it is unlikely that the cliff-hanger will ever be resolved. Big Finish producer Gary Russell, who wrote the story, has also stated that he has no firm plans for continuing the story and it should, for the moment, be regarded as "unofficial". Real-Time has, however, been released on CD by Big Finish, so leaves an unresolved contradiction within the Big Finish Whoniverse regarding Evelyn's eventual fate between Real-Time and A Death in the Family.

List of appearances

Audio dramas
The Marian Conspiracy
The Spectre of Lanyon Moor (meets the Brigadier)
The Apocalypse Element (meets Romana; first encounter with the Daleks)
Bloodtide (faces the Silurians)
Project: Twilight
Real-time (faces the Cybermen)
The Sandman
Jubilee
Doctor Who and the Pirates
Project: Lazarus
Arrangements for War
Medicinal Purposes
Pier Pressure
Thicker than Water ('flash-forward' to her departure from the TARDIS; the Doctor visits her while he's travelling with Mel; a brief encounter with the Seventh Doctor)
The Nowhere Place
100
An assassin in the Limelight
A Death in the Family (visited by the Seventh Doctor, Ace and Hex; culminates in her death)
A Town Called Fortune
The Crimes of Thomas Brewster (meets former companion Thomas Brewster and future companion Flip Jackson)
The Feast of Axos
Industrial Evolution

Novels
Instruments of Darkness
Spiral Scratch

Short Stories
"Mortlake" by Mark Wright (Short Trips: Past Tense)
"The Diplomat's Story" by Kathryn Sullivan (Short Trips: Repercussions)
"Jupiter" by Andy Russell (Short Trips: The Solar System)
"Christmas on the Moon" by Simon Guerrier (Short Trips: The History of Christmas)
"Old Boys" by James Parsons & Andrew Stirling-Brown (Short Trips: The Centenarian)
"The Eighth Wonder of the World" by Simon Guerrier (Short Trips: Dalek Empire)
"The Crackers" by Richard Salter (Short Trips: The Ghosts of Christmas)

External links

Literary characters introduced in 2000
Doctor Who spin-off companions
Doctor Who audio characters